Admiral Elliot may refer to:

Charles Elliot (1801–1875), British Royal Navy admiral
Charles Elliot (1818–1895), British Royal Navy admiral
George Elliot (Royal Navy officer, born 1784) (1784–1863), British Royal Navy admiral
George Elliot (Royal Navy officer, born 1813) (1813–1901), British Royal Navy admiral
John Elliot (Royal Navy officer) (1732–1808), British Royal Navy admiral
Walter John Elliot (1914–1979), Canadian Navy surgeon-rear admiral

See also
Middleton Stuart Elliott (1872–1952), United States Navy vice admiral